Adria is a town in the Veneto region of Italy.

Adria may also refer to:

People
Adria (given name)
Adrià, given name

Albert Adrià Acosta (born 1968), Spanish chef
Ferran Adrià i Acosta (born 1962), Catalan chef from Spain

Places
Atri, Italy, a town formerly called Adria, in the Abruzzo region of Italy
Adria (river), a former channel of the Po Delta passing by Adria, Italy
Operational Zone of the Adriatic Littoral, known colloquially as Operationszone Adria, a German World War II district
143 Adria, an asteroid

In business
Adria Airways, former Slovenian flag carrier airline
Adria Ferries
Adria Mobil, a Slovenian producer of caravans and motorhomes
Adria oil pipeline, in central Europe
Adria LNG, a proposed liquefied natural gas regasification terminal on the island of Krk, Croatia
Adria (motorcycle), a German motorcycle and engine manufacturing company
Adria, a Swiss watch brand - see Adriatica
ADRIA, the Alternative Dispute Resolution Institute of Alberta

Sports
Adria International Raceway, an auto racing track in Adria, Italy
Adria Mobil, cycling team
RWB Adria, a Croatian-American soccer club in Chicago

Other
 Adria (bug), a genus of stink bugs or shield bugs

See also

Adriatic (disambiguation)

Greater Adria, a micropaleocontinent
Greek ship Adrias, a Graecian navy ship name